Dypsis madagascariensis (commonly known as the lucuba palm) is a species of flowering plant in the family Arecaceae. It is found only in Madagascar. It is threatened by habitat loss.

References

madagascariensis
Endemic flora of Madagascar
Near threatened plants
Taxa named by Odoardo Beccari
Taxonomy articles created by Polbot